Selim Ekbom  (9 April 1807 in Turku – 20 April 1886 in Vaasa) was a Finnish politician. He was a member of the Senate of Finland.

Finnish politicians
Finnish senators
1807 births
1886 deaths
People from Turku